Highway 17A is a  long route connecting Highway 99 and Highway 17; this route was originally numbered Highway 17 between these two points but the numbering was altered once the South Fraser Perimeter Road neared completion (on December 1, 2012). 

It terminates and continues at its northern end as 62b Street which becomes River Road, a secondary connector from South Delta to North Delta which passes Tilbury Industrial Park. Trucks are no longer permitted to travel on Highway 17A except for local delivery, as the newer Highway 17 expressway was partly intended to keep trucks out of Ladner and provide a traffic-light free connection between Highway 99 and Deltaport, which is expecting huge expansion in the near future.

Former Portion (Vancouver Island)
Highway 17A, known locally as West Saanich Road, was an alternate route through the Saanich peninsula.  While the four-lane Highway 17 takes a path along the eastern half of the peninsula, Highway 17A, which had only two lanes, took the western side.  Highway 17A was used as the primary access to the famous Butchart Gardens, as well as the ferry across the Saanich Inlet, used to bypass the Malahat Drive.  The highway was first designated 17A in 1962, and lost its designation on 15 May 1998 after its component routes were devolved. 

Highway 17A's total length was 27 km (17 mi).  The highway started off in the south by branching off from Highway 17 at the Royal Oak Drive interchange.  Highway 17A then turned on to the road officially named West Saanich Road at its intersection with Royal Oak Drive, and followed a winding path through Saanich.  After 9 km (6 mi) through Saanich, the Highway entered the Central Saanich district.

1 km (about ½ mi) north of the boundary between Saanich and Central Saanich, Highway 17A entered the community of Brentwood Bay, which is where the Saanich Inlet Ferry and the Butchart Gardens are located.  Highway 17A goes through Brentwood Bay for 2 km (1¼ mi), then entered North Saanich for another 4 km (2½ mi) north as it began to hug the eastern shore of the Saanich Inlet.  Highway 17A winded through North Saanich for 9 km (6 mi) before meeting an intersection with Wain Road, at which point the Highway turned east.  Highway 17A followed Wain Road for 2 km (1¼ mi) before terminating at Highway 17's Wain Road interchange, just south of Swartz Bay.

West Saanich Road itself did not follow the 17A route after Wain Rd.  West Saanich continues northward, terminating at Land's End Road. Going west ultimately loops back to West Saanich Road, while heading eastward on Land's End leads to the Swartz Bay Ferry Terminal.

Exit list
The entire route is in Metro Vancouver.

References

017A
Transport in Delta, British Columbia
017A
017A
Transport on Vancouver Island